Zhang Fengyu (born 10 May 1989) is a Chinese footballer who currently plays as a defender for Qingdao Hainiu F.C..

Club career
Zhang Fengyu started his football career with the Shandong Luneng youth team where he raised through their ranks and won the National U15 League Championship as well as the 2005 National U17 League Championship. In the 2008 league season he was loaned out to third tier club Nanjing Baotai to gain senior playing time. On his return he was not promoted to the senior team of Shandong Luneng and he left to join another top tier club in Qingdao Jonoon in the 2010 Chinese Super League season. On 25 September 2010 he made his debut for the club in a league game against Shaanxi Renhe in a match that ended in a 1-0 defeat. The following season would see him struggle to establish himself within the team and he was loaned out to Hebei Zhongji and Shandong Tengding

Zhang would make his move to Shandong Tengding permanently, however at the end of the 2014 China League Two league season the club was unable to gain promotion and disbanded. Despite being only 25 years old, Zhang retired from playing and returned to his hometown to raise his family. After several years out of the game he joined amateur football club Zibo Cuju and he was part of the team that quickly rose up the divisions, winning the 2017 China Amateur Football League and promotion into the professional leagues. After five seasons with the club, Zhang would return to his former club in Qingdao as they re-branded themselves as Qingdao Hainiu. He would go on to play a vital part as the club won the third tier title and promotion at the end of the 2021 China League Two season. He would go on to achieve successive promotions as he helped guide the club to second in the 2022 China League One season and promotion back into the top tier.

Career statistics

Honours

Club
Qingdao Hainiu
China League Two: 2021

References

External links

1989 births
Living people
Chinese footballers
Association football defenders
Chinese Super League players
China League One players
Qingdao Hainiu F.C. (1990) players
Hebei F.C. players